Attenella delantala is a species of spiny crawler mayfly in the family Ephemerellidae. It is found in the western United States.

References

Mayflies
Articles created by Qbugbot
Insects described in 1952